The 1790 Footprints refer to a set of footprints found near the Kīlauea volcano in present-day Hawaii Volcanoes National Park on the island of Hawaii. Resulting from an unusually explosive eruption, they may be associated with a series of battles in the area in 1790.

Background

The 1782 Battle of Mokuōhai gave Kamehameha I control of the west and north sides of the island of Hawaii, but Keōua Kuahuula and his uncle Keawemauhili were able to escape.

For a few years, while Kamehameha was occupied with Maui and the arrival of Europeans to Kona, Keōua ruled Kaū and Keawemauhili ruled Hilo.

By 1790, Keawemauhili and Kamehameha had made peace. Keawemauhili aided Kamehameha's invasion of Maui that same year. This cooperation broke an agreement between Keawemauhili and Keōua. Keōua, angered, raided some of the lands of Kamehameha while he was in Maui at the Battle of Kepaniwai.

Keōua then attacked and killed his uncle at Hilo. Kamehameha returned from Maui to the Big Island, and Keōua ambushed them in a thick forest of Paauhau, but the battle was inconclusive (near coordinates ). Kamehameha counterattacked and drove Keōua back, in what is known as the Battle of Koapapaʻa. Kamehameha had brought a cannon salvaged from the ship ' captured at Kaūpūlehu. Keōua captured the piece, but did not have gunpowder nor expertise to use it effectively. After heavy losses on both sides, the commanders each decided to retreat to their secure territory.

The footprints were thought to have been left by Keōua's forces in their retreat. While passing Kīlauea, they made offerings to the goddess Pele and made camp. As the volcano started to erupt, they thought they might have made some offense, so he split his group into three and stayed to make more offerings.

Two parties of warriors were overwhelmed by a pyroclastic eruption while crossing the desert. Only one party of three survived the eruption. The footprints were attributed by early geologist Thomas Jaggar to those warriors who were killed in this event.
Keōua would be killed later in 1791 at Kawaihae.

The Ancient Hawaiians kept elaborate oral histories, but did not accurately count years from the Christian era.
This corresponded to an eruption witnessed in 1790 by British sailor John Young.
It probably was given the specific name because it was an unusual kind of eruption for Hawaiian volcanoes.
Surveyor Frederick S. Lyman used the 1790 date to estimate people's birthdates during his 1857 tax assessment.

New research

More recent research indicates that some or all of the footprints may in fact be attributable to everyday activities, and not to the war parties.
Extensive surveys were done in 1998 and 2000 including radiocarbon dating the few samples of charcoal that could be found. A large number of habitation sites and trails were counted, indicating the area was in use for hundreds of years during the eruption cycle of 1500 to 1790.

Modern forensic techniques applied in 2008 determined that many of the footprints were made by women and children, not warriors. They were probably already in the area chipping off sharp chunks of glass to use as tools, and left the footprints while escaping during a lull in the eruption.
Keōua's groups, however, were at the summit, and some were killed instantly by the following blast of poison gas, not by the actual falling of the ash. Although sometimes called "fossilized", the imprints are not old enough to be true fossils. The fine ash was probably made into thick mud by a rain triggered in the eruption, which then quickly solidified in the tropical sun and was preserved in the arid desert.

Recognition

The footprints were found accidentally by geologist Ruy H. Finch in the hardened ash of the Kaʻū Desert while he was trying to investigate a 1919 eruption that produced Mauna Iki (small mountain). Although the National Park had been formed by then, these lands were owned by the Territory of Hawaii. In 1938 the area was proposed as a bombing practice range, resulting in protest from conservation groups. On June 20, 1938, the Federal Government bought the land to add to the park, with the bombing range limited to four and a half square miles. The Army never used the land, but the Navy caused some injuries to fishermen in 1945. In June 1950 the bombing range was returned to the park after being cleared of unexploded ordinances.

In 1941 the Civilian Conservation Corps built a trail and shelter. It is designated as Hawaii state archaeological site number 10-61-5505 and was listed in the National Register of Historic Places on August 7, 1974, as site number 74000351.

From this trailhead (coordinates ) the Footprints Trail leads about a mile southeast to the area. The site can also be accessed by the Kaū Desert trailhead on Crater Rim Drive at coordinates . These trails or roads might be closed during high levels of volcanic activity.

References

National Register of Historic Places in Hawaiʻi Volcanoes National Park
Battles involving Hawaii
Conflicts in 1790
Ancient Hawaii
Natural disasters in Hawaii
1790 in Hawaii
18th-century disasters in Oceania